Aptunga setadebilia is a species of snout moth. It was described by Herbert H. Neunzig in 1996. It is found in the Dominican Republic.

The length of the forewings is 8.5–9 mm.

References

Moths described in 1996
Phycitinae
Moths of the Caribbean